Walterstown GFC is a Gaelic Athletic Association football club based in & around the town of Navan, in County Meath, Ireland. The club plays Gaelic Football competing in Meath GAA & Leinster competitions. The club has a proud tradition having won the Meath Senior Football Championship five times & the Leinster Senior Club championship twice.

History
Walterstown GFC was founded in 1902 and one of the first mentions of the club was when they entered a Dunshaughlin tournament in aid of the parochial house. The club won the first two Senior Football Championships in 1887 and 1888 under the name Dowdstown GAA. In the late 1970s and 1980s the club won more titles and are currently the only club from Meath to have won a Leinster Senior Club Football Championship twice.

As of now the club provides Girls/Ladies football at U6, U8, U10, U11, U12, U13, U14, U15, U16, U19 & Senior levels and Boys/Mens football at U6, U8, U10, U12, U13, U14, U15, U16, U18, U21 & Senior.

Honours

Meath Senior Football Championship: 5
 1978, 1980, 1982, 1983, 1984
 Leinster Senior Club Football Championship: 2
 1980, 1983
Feis Cup: 3
 1969, 1986, 1988
 Meath Intermediate Football Championship: 1
 1964
 Meath Junior Football Championship: 2
 1961, 1978

References
Michael heary stanny heary

External links

Gaelic games clubs in County Meath